Karlıova District is a district of Bingöl Province in Turkey. The town of Karlıova is the seat and the district had a population of 28,309 in 2021.

The district was established in 1934.

Composition 
Beside the town of Karlıova, the district encompasses forty-seven villages and twenty-two hamlets.

 Aşağıyağmurlu
 Bağlıisa
 Bahçeköy
 Boncukgöze
 Cilligöl
 Çatak
 Çiftlikköy
 Çukurtepe
 Dörtyol
 Geçitli
 Göynük
 Hacılar
 Halifan
 Harmantepe
 Hasanova
 Ilıpınar
 Kalencik
 Kantarkaya
 Karabalçık
 Kargapazarı
 Karlıca
 Kaşıkçı
 Kaynak
 Kaynarpınar
 Kazanlı
 Kıraçtepe
 Kızılağaç
 Kızılçubuk
 Kümbet
 Kürük
 Mollaşakir
 Ortaköy
 Sakaören
 Sarıkuşak
 Serpmekaya
 Soğukpınar
 Suçatı
 Sudurağı
 Taşlıçay
 Toklular
 Tuzluca
 Viranşehir
 Yeniköy
 Yiğitler
 Yoncalık
 Yorgançayır
 Yukarıyağmurlu

References 

Districts of Bingöl Province